Shakti Pumps India Limited  is a manufacturer of submersible pumps for domestic, industrial, horticultural and agricultural use. Shakti pumps exports to more than 100 countries, with branches in the USA, Australia and UAE.The company is listed in the Bombay Stock Exchange and the National Stock Exchange of India. The company has two manufacturing facilities with a capacity of 500,000 pumps per year. Shakti Pumps is also one of the largest manufacturers and exporters of solar pumps in India.

History 
Shakti Pumps was incorporated in 1982 by the Patidar family of Rau (Indore) to manufacture submersible pumps and electric control panels. In 1995, the company went public with an issue of Rs 500 lakh.

Later in 1996, company expanded its portfolio by manufacturing stainless steel submersible pumps and motors. In the same year, Shakti Pumps started its export operation.

In the year 2006, company was acknowledged with one star export house status. In the same year, the company established a branch office in Australia and Turkey.

Products and Services 
The company manufactures submersible pumps and submersible motors and associated control panels under the name Shakti.

The company is second largest stainless steel submersible pump sets manufacturer in the world.

References

Companies listed on the Bombay Stock Exchange
Companies based in Indore
Manufacturing companies established in 1982
Pump manufacturers
Companies listed on the National Stock Exchange of India
Indian brands
1982 establishments in Madhya Pradesh
Indian companies established in 1982